Footscray railway station is the junction for the Sunbury, Werribee and Williamstown lines in Victoria, Australia. It serves the western Melbourne suburb of Footscray, and it opened on 17 January 1859.

The station is also serviced by V/Line Ballarat, Bendigo and Geelong services.

A disused signal box is located on the island platform at the Up (Flinders Street) end of Platform 5, while a pair of dual gauge tracks form the mainly freight only South Kensington–West Footscray line under the station, running in a cutting before entering the Bunbury Street tunnel, providing a rail link to the Port of Melbourne and other freight terminals, as well as access to Southern Cross for the NSW TrainLink XPT, The Overland, and V/Line Albury services.

History

On 17 January 1859, the railways arrived in Footscray, when the new Williamstown line opened, with trains operating from Spencer Street in Melbourne to the important cargo port of Williamstown. This railway line connected to the 18-month-old Geelong line at the junction near where the current Newport station exists. The line between Melbourne and Footscray, via the new station at North Melbourne, had been made possible with the construction of a railway bridge over the Maribyrnong River. The first station to open in Footscray opened on this line on the first day of service. It was not where the current Footscray station lies, but was located on Napier Street.

Shortly afterwards, Footscray became a junction station, when a second railway line, branching at Footscray, was opened to Sunbury. By 1862, that line had been extended to Sandhurst (later renamed Bendigo). Therefore, on 1 March 1859, less than two months after the first, Footscray's second railway station opened on Nicholson Street, not far from the original Napier Street location, for services on the new line. From 1879, a signal box was provided at the junction.

On 16 September 1900, the current station opened, located at the junction of the two lines. The two original stations were then closed.

A number of sidings once existed at the station, but they are now covered by car parking on the eastern side of the Newport-bound lines. In 1972, the last siding at the station (siding "B") was abolished.

On 21 October 1928, the dual-gauge lines under the station were provided, as part of the South Kensington–West Footscray line, and were dual-gauged in the early 1960s, as part of the construction of the Melbourne–Albury standard gauge line. Quadruplication of the tracks towards Melbourne in November 1976 put an end to the junction and the signal box was closed, but the building is listed on the Victorian Heritage Register.

On 31 May 1996, Footscray was upgraded to a Premium Station, although the enclosed waiting area and ticket facilities were built in 1993, as part of the "Travel Safe" program of the early 1990s.

On 5 June 2001, at around 08:30, two suburban Comeng train sets collided on Platform 4. An out-of-service train heading to Newport collided with a Williamstown bound train, carrying around 20 passengers, with three injuries reported.

In 2010, as a part of the Brumby State Government's Footscray renewal program, the existing footbridge over the platforms, which was accessed by ramps, was replaced with a $15 million footbridge. The bridge, named after Indigenous activist William Cooper, has stairs and associated lifts. Complaints have been made that the new footbridge is less usable than the one it replaced. It has a roof, but that has not been designed to be weatherproof, and the lifts are prone to breakdown.

During the 2017/2018 financial year, it was the sixth busiest station on Melbourne's metropolitan network, with 5.26 million passenger movements recorded.

Regional Rail Link upgrade
From 2012-2014, Footscray station underwent major upgrade and conservation works as part of the Regional Rail Link project.

An additional two platforms were built to the north of the existing platforms, to separate Metro Trains' Sunbury services from V/Line services to Ballarat, Bendigo and Geelong. On 20 January 2014, coinciding with the opening of the new platforms and a new ticket office and waiting area adjacent to Platform 1 on Irving Street, Platforms 1 to 4 were renumbered 3 to 6, with the new platforms commissioned as Platforms 1 and 2. At the same time, Platforms 3 and 4 were closed to be rebuilt as dedicated platforms for V/Line services, reopening along with the commissioning of new Regional Rail Link tracks between Sunshine and Southern Cross on 16 July 2014. A new waiting area and toilet facility for regional services was also opened between Platforms 4 and 5.

The existing footbridge, erected in 2010 at a cost of $15 million, was also partially demolished in 2013, to help accommodate the works. New canopies, stairs and escalators were erected at the Irving and Hyde Street ends of the footbridge, and new wide ramps were built from the footbridge to the platforms and street level, to help people access the platforms with greater ease. New lifts were also added to the structure.

The car-park that used to be on Irving Street was relocated to McNab Avenue, and a new forecourt with greenery and seating areas, along with two new kiosks, were opened, close to the Irving Street entrance to the station. The most famous of these was the former Olympic Hot Doughnuts kiosk, which had a public opening day on 9 July 2014. Former Premier Denis Napthine was in attendance.

By November 2014, all works at the station were complete.

Platforms and services

Footscray has two island platforms with four faces, and two side platforms. It is serviced by Metro Trains' Sunbury, Werribee and Williamstown line services, and V/Line Ballarat, Bendigo and Geelong line services.

Platform 1:
  all stations services to Flinders Street

Platform 2:
  all station and limited express services to Watergardens and Sunbury

By late 2025, it is planned that trains on the Sunbury line will be through-routed with those on the Pakenham and Cranbourne lines, via the new Metro Tunnel.

Platform 3:
  V/Line services to Southern Cross (set down only)
  V/Line services to Southern Cross (set down only)
  V/Line services to Southern Cross (set down only)
  V/Line services to Southern Cross (set down only)
  V/Line services to Southern Cross (set down only)
  V/Line services to Southern Cross (set down only)
  V/Line services to Southern Cross (set down only)

Platform 4:
  V/Line services to Melton, Bacchus Marsh and Wendouree (pick up only)
  V/Line services to Ararat (pick up only)
  V/Line services to Bendigo, Epsom and Eaglehawk (pick up only)
  V/Line services to Echuca (pick up only)
  V/Line services to Swan Hill (pick up only)
  V/Line services to Wyndham Vale, Geelong and Waurn Ponds (pick up only)
  V/Line services to Warrnambool (pick up only)

Platform 5:
  all station and limited express services to Flinders Street and Frankston
  all stations services to Flinders Street and Frankston

Platform 6:
  all stations services to Laverton via Altona (weekdays only); all stations services to Werribee
  all stations services to Williamstown

Transport links

CDC Melbourne operates six routes via Footscray station, under contract to Public Transport Victoria:
 : to Keilor East
 : Yarraville station – Highpoint Shopping Centre
 : Sunshine station – Footscray
 : Laverton station – Footscray
 : Laverton station – Footscray
 : to Laverton station

Kinetic Melbourne operates three routes via Footscray station, under contract to Public Transport Victoria:
 : Sunshine station – Melbourne CBD (Queen Street)
 : Sunshine station – Melbourne CBD (Queen Street)
 : Yarraville – Highpoint Shopping Centre

Transit Systems Victoria operates five routes via Footscray station, under contract to Public Transport Victoria:
 : to East Melbourne
 : to University of Melbourne Parkville Campus
 : to Moonee Ponds Junction
 : Williamstown – Moonee Ponds Junction
  : Footscray – Newport station (Saturday and Sunday mornings only)

Yarra Trams operates one route to and from Footscray station:
 : to Moonee Ponds Junction

Gallery

References

External links

 Melway map at street-directory.com.au

Heritage-listed buildings in Melbourne
Listed railway stations in Australia
Premium Melbourne railway stations
Railway stations in Australia opened in 1859
Railway stations in Melbourne
Railway stations in the City of Maribyrnong